Jacqueline Allene Means is an American Anglican priest. On January 1, 1977, she became the first woman to be regularly ordained a priest in the Episcopal Church in the United States of America. The Episcopal Church's General Convention had approved the ordination of women to the priesthood in September 1976, and this had come into force on New Year's Day 1977. Women had been ordained in 1974 and 1975 (the Philadelphia Eleven and the Washington Four), but as this was without the approval of the General Convention, their ordinations were declared irregular.

Rev. Means served as rector in Plainfield, Indiana from 1986 until 1998. Since 1999, she has directed prison ministries in the Office of the Bishop for the Armed Forces, Health Services and Prison Ministries. In 2001, Rev. Means received an honorary degree from the Church Divinity School of the Pacific.

References

Living people
20th-century American Episcopal priests
21st-century American Episcopal priests
Women Anglican clergy
Year of birth missing (living people)